Utricularia arnhemica is an affixed aquatic or terrestrial carnivorous plant that belongs to the genus Utricularia (family Lentibulariaceae). It is endemic to the Arnhem Land area in the Northern Territory of Australia.

See also 
 List of Utricularia species

References 

Carnivorous plants of Australia
Flora of the Northern Territory
arnhemica
Lamiales of Australia